Brienne is a commune in the Saône-et-Loire department in the region of Bourgogne-Franche-Comté in eastern France. It is 37 km from Mâcon, the department capital.

Geography
The Sâne Vive forms the commune's south-eastern border, then flow into the Seille, which forms its western and north-western borders.

See also
Communes of the Saône-et-Loire department

References

Communes of Saône-et-Loire